Seaforth may refer to:

Places

Australia 

 Seaforth, New South Wales, a suburb of Sydney
 Seaforth, Queensland, a town in the Mackay Region

Canada 

Seaforth, Nova Scotia, Canada, a community
 Seaforth, Ontario, Canada, a community

Jamaica 

 Seaforth, Jamaica, a settlement

United Kingdom 
 Seaforth, Merseyside, England, a district

United States 
 Seaforth, Minnesota, United States, a city
 Seaforth, North Carolina, United States, an unincorporated community

Maritime
 Seaforth Battery, dismantled in 1928
 Seaforth Dock, on the River Mersey, England, at Seaforth, north of Liverpool
 Seaforth Island, Scotland, an uninhabited island in the Outer Hebrides
 Loch Seaforth, Scotland
 Seaforth River, New Zealand

Ships 

, a Royal Navy ship, formerly the French brig Dame Ernouf
MV Seaforth, a coaster
MV Loch Seaforth 1947 and 2014, Stornoway ferries

Other
 Seaforth (band), duo of Tom Jordan and Mitch Thompson from Australia
 Seaforth Armoury, Vancouver, British Columbia, Canada
 Seaforth House, a mansion (1813–81)
 Seaforth Country Classic, a golf tournament on the Canadian Tour
 Seaforth railway station, Western Australia
 Seaforth, a 1994 BBC mini-series set during and after the Second World War, and starring Linus Roache
 Earl of Seaforth, a title in the Scottish and Irish peerage
 Unionville Seaforths, a defunct Canadian junior ice hockey team

See also
 Seaforth Highlanders, a former British Army regiment
 The Seaforth Highlanders of Canada, a Canadian Army reserve infantry established in 1910